The 2006 Ballon d'Or, given to the best football player in Europe as judged by a panel of sports journalists from UEFA member countries, was awarded to the Italian defender Fabio Cannavaro on 27 November 2006. On 16 October 2006, was announced the shortlist of 50 male players compiled by a group of experts from France Football. There were 52 voters, from Albania, Andorra, Armenia, Austria, Azerbaijan, Belarus, Belgium, Bosnia and Herzegovina, Bulgaria, Croatia, Cyprus, Czech Republic, Denmark, England, Estonia, Faroe Islands, Finland, France, Georgia, Germany, Greece, Hungary, Iceland, Israel, Italy, Kazakhstan, Latvia, Liechtenstein, Lithuania, Luxembourg, Macedonia, Malta, Moldova, the Netherlands, Northern Ireland, Norway, Poland, Portugal, Republic of Ireland, Romania, Russia, San Marino, Scotland, Serbia, Slovakia, Slovenia, Spain, Sweden, Switzerland, Turkey, Ukraine and Wales. Each picked a first (5pts), second (4pts), third (3pts), fourth (2pts) and  fifth choice (1pt). 

Fabio Cannavaro is the last defender to have won the award.

2006 Ballon d'Or Rankings

Voted players

Non-voted players
The following 24 men were originally in contention for the 2006 Ballon d’Or, but did not receive any votes:

References

External links
 France Football Official website
 Rec.Sport.Soccer Statistics Foundation - "Ballon d'Or" 2006 voting results

2006
2006–07 in European football